Victoria Road is an unincorporated community in the Canadian province of Ontario, located within the single-tier municipality of Kawartha Lakes. The village was built around a station on the Toronto and Nipissing Railway, which was constructed in 1872. The station — the second last on the line — served the community and area until the last train passed through in 1965, after which the tracks were lifted.

Victoria Road is located on the north-eastern tip of Mitchell Lake. At the peak of the village, it contained several small industries and three hotels.

The origin of the name is unknown, but likely from the Victoria Colonization Road, today's Kawartha Lakes Road 35, which was built between 1859 and 1861 and passes through the village. For a time, the village was known as "The City of Peace" and "The Road."

An 1881 survey map lists it as the village of Bexley, with the railroad station listed as Victoria Road Station.

References

See also 
List of communities in Ontario

Communities in Kawartha Lakes